The Reform Conservatives (Die Reformkonservativen, REKOS) was a conservative political party in Austria.

The party was launched on 23 December 2013 by Ewald Stadler, a former member of the National Council and eurosceptic MEP for the Freedom Party (FPÖ) and the Alliance for the Future (BZÖ). In the run-up of the 2014 European Parliament election, REKOS formed a joint list with the Christian Party of Austria (CPÖ).

The Reform Conservatives want to abolish the European Parliament and to reverse the 1992 Maastricht Treaty that created the European Union. They plan to cooperate with the right-wing eurosceptic Europe of Freedom and Democracy group.

Leadership
Ewald Stadler (2014–present)
Alexander Tschugguel

References

External links
Official website

2013 establishments in Austria
Political parties established in 2013
Conservative parties in Austria
Eurosceptic parties in Austria
Nationalist parties in Austria
Right-wing populism in Austria